Thomas Bateman (8 November 1821 (baptised) – 28 August 1861) was an English antiquary and barrow-digger.

Biography
Thomas Bateman was born in Rowsley, Derbyshire, England, the son of the amateur archaeologist William Bateman. After the death of his father in 1835, Bateman was raised by his grandfather, and from the age of 16 he helped run the family estate at Middleton Hall in Middleton-by-Youlgreave, during which time he became interested in archaeology: Sir Richard Colt Hoare's Ancient History of North and South Wiltshire influenced him greatly. He built Lomberdale Hall in 1844 as his private residence. Bateman had a long affair with Mary Ann Mason, but she was already married. He married Sarah Parker on 2 August 1847 and they had four daughters and a son.

Bateman's first archaeological experience was observing the demolition of a medieval church in Bakewell. He joined the British Archaeological Association in 1843 and in 1844, whilst at an archaeological congress in Canterbury, participated in the excavation of barrows in the surrounding countryside. The following year he excavated 38 barrows in Derbyshire and Staffordshire, earning himself the nickname "The Barrow Knight".

In 1847, he published Vestiges of the Antiquities of Derbyshire which united his work with that of earlier excavators in the area. With the help of Samuel Carrington of Wetton he continued to excavate barrows, 50 in the period 1848–1849 and a further 22 between 1851 and 1861, when he died. His second book was Ten Years' Diggings in Celtic and Saxon Grave Hills in the Counties of Derby, Stafford and York, published in the year of his death and it had the details of his work including Heath Wood barrow cemetery.

He was buried, following his instructions, in unconsecrated ground on a hillside in Middleton. His tomb is a Grade II listed building.

After his death, his son sold most of Bateman's collections, parts of which were acquired by the Sheffield City Museum (now called the Weston Park Museum) in 1893, including the celebrated Benty Grange helmet found in Benty Grange, Derbyshire. A daughter Clara Theodora Bateman married Harcourt Clare.

In 2006, a bequest allowed Derbyshire Libraries to purchase a collection that had been amassed by Bateman by inserting documents into the four Derbyshire volumes of Lysons' Magna Britannia. Among the prints was an image of his museum at his home which is dated from around his death. A long description of his museum is found in Eliza Meteyard's novel Dora and her Papa.

Publications
 Vestiges of the Antiquities of Derbyshire, and the Sepulchral Usages of Its Inhabitants (1848), with Stephen Glover

References

 Marsden, B.M., 2007, The Barrow Knight, Ryestone Books

External links
 

1821 births
1861 deaths
English archaeologists
People from Derbyshire Dales (district)
Fellows of the Ethnological Society of London